Antonio Vázquez Mejido (born 26 January 1961) is a Spanish archer who competed in the 1980 Summer Olympics, in the 1988 Summer Olympics, in the 1992 Summer Olympics, and in the 1996 Summer Olympics.

He was born in Levinco, Aller, Asturias.

In 1980 he finished 29th in the individual competition.

Eight years later at the 1988 Summer Olympics he finished 32nd in the individual event. He was also part of the Spanish team which finished 17th in the team competition.

1992 he finished 18th in the individual qualification round and was eliminated in the first round of the knockout stage. But with the Spanish team he won an astonishing gold medal in the team event.

His last Olympic appearance was in 1996 when he finished 60th in the individual qualification round. In the following knockout stage he was eliminated in the first round.

External links
 profile

1961 births
Living people
Sportspeople from Asturias
Spanish male archers
Olympic archers of Spain
Archers at the 1980 Summer Olympics
Archers at the 1988 Summer Olympics
Archers at the 1992 Summer Olympics
Archers at the 1996 Summer Olympics
Olympic gold medalists for Spain
Olympic medalists in archery
Medalists at the 1992 Summer Olympics
20th-century Spanish people